People's Watch is an Indian Human Rights NGO founded by a group of social activists in 1995 and is based in Madurai in the southern Indian state of Tamil Nadu.

Originally working solely in Tamil Nadu, People's Watch has recently moved into working at a national level with funding provided by the European Union and other donor agencies for the National Project on the Prevention of Torture in India. People's Watch is widely recognised as the leading Human Rights organisation in India.

From 1995-98, People's Watch concentrated its activities on monitoring of human rights violations. This was the mandate of its governing body and the Program Advisory Board. It was soon realized that monitoring alone was insufficient. In 1998, People's Watch began legal intervention on behalf of victims. By 2000, this work had grown and more field monitoring associates were hired at both zonal and regional levels. By 2001, People's Watch was working in 11 areas of Tamil Nadu. Soon after, the need to launch a full-fledged awareness building Campaign for Human Rights became clear, and this was followed, soon afterward, by the realization that victim rehabilitation was also essential. Monitoring, intervention and even winning compensation from the courts was not enough for those who had survived torture, abuse and imprisonment. They desperately needed medical, psychological and vocational help as well. Preceding the United Nations Decade for Human Rights Education, People's Watch began a vigorous training and education program. 

Building on a mandate to monitor violations the growth and development of a broad range of individuals People's Watch initiated in committed to, knowledgeable and skilled in human rights work, 1997–98, the first Human Rights Education program in nine Tamil Nadu schools in 9th standard. By 2002-2005, standards 6-9th were involved in human rights education in nearly 800 schools, and teachers and students alike were reporting extraordinary classroom interest and enthusiasm. The need for human rights education at the college level was clear, as was the need to reach law students, movements, other NGOs, professional groups, elected representatives, trade unions, political parties and the media. By 2004, when the Strategic Planning process began, People's Watch had developed into a highly respected, effective NGO, making connections, facilitating programs and spreading both a heightened awareness and an imperative to be an agent for change.

People's Watch is a member organization of the Asian Forum for Human Rights and Development (FORUM-ASIA).

References 

Organisations based in Tamil Nadu
Human rights organisations based in India
1995 establishments in Tamil Nadu
Organizations established in 1995